High Shields railway station served the suburb of High Shields, South Tyneside, England, from 1842 to 1981 on the Brandling Junction Railway.

History 
The station was opened as South Shields on 19 June 1839 by the Brandling Junction Railway Company. Despite its name, it was actually in High Shields. It was known as Market Place in the local newspaper. It was resited to the north on 17 December 1842. The new site was known as the 'Station at Grewcock's corner' in the notice upon opening. 

It was resited in 1879 and closed on 1 June 1981, when the South Shields branch line was closed for conversion to a Tyne and Wear Metro route.  The new Metro line however used the former Stanhope and Tyne Railway alignment to reach the town centre, instead of the former B.J.R route, reflecting the gradual movement of the population away from the river over the previous century, so  the station was not reopened for Metro services when they began in March 1984.  

The track was subsequently lifted, with the station platforms and buildings demolished - no trace now remains, as the location has been cleared and landscaped.

References 

Railway stations in Great Britain opened in 1842
Railway stations in Great Britain closed in 1879
Railway stations in Great Britain opened in 1879
Railway stations in Great Britain closed in 1981
1842 establishments in England
1981 disestablishments in England